The known human niacin receptors (or nicotinic acid receptors, abbreviated NIACR) are:

 Niacin receptor 1 (NIACR1, formerly known as GPR109A)
 Niacin receptor 2 (NIACR2, formerly known as GPR109B)